I Can Explain is a 1922 American silent comedy film directed by George D. Baker and starring Gareth Hughes, Bartine Burkett, and Grace Darmond.

Plot
As described in a film magazine, Jimmy Berry (Hughes), a much misunderstood young man, is persecuted by his jealous business partner Howard Dawson (Heyes) whenever the latter catches up with him. When Howard finds Jimmy and his wife Dorothy (Darmond) together on the golf links, he tries to shoot Jimmy. While Jimmy maintains that he "can explain everything," Howard will not listen. He proposes that Jimmy should relocate to the New York City office, and then to South America, to separate him from Howard's wife. When he leaves for South America, Dorothy takes the same ship and further complications arise when they are found together upon disembarking. Jimmy is thrown in jail by President Gardez (Wallock), and then becomes involved in a revolution that is being staged by some outlaws. They escape on a passing ship and Jimmy convinces Howard that he is in love with his sweetheart, Betty Carson (Burkett). They arrive back in the United States in time to save Betty from an unwelcome marriage.

Cast

References

Bibliography
 Munden, Kenneth White. The American Film Institute Catalog of Motion Pictures Produced in the United States, Part 1. University of California Press, 1997.

External links

1922 films
American black-and-white films
American silent feature films
Films directed by George D. Baker
Metro Pictures films
1922 comedy films
1920s English-language films
1920s American films
Silent American comedy films